Narciso Irala Martínez Del Villar (Portugalete, Biscay, Basque Country, Spain , February 7, 1896 – May 13, 1988) was a Spanish Jesuit, psychiatrist and missionary. During his stay in China he described the conditions of suffering that the Chinese were going to war with.

Irala has held several conferences in Brazil.

Biography 
In 1913 Irala joined the Society of Jesus and, in the same year, was sent on a mission to Wuhu in China, where he remained for 22 years. Irala was still in Argentina for four years, and because of communism he left China to live in Brazil, where he began to give conferences on psychiatry.

Irala was a speaker in more than 50 countries.

Work 
In Portuguese.

 Efficiency without Fatigue, 1969. ISBN 8427102690

References 

Portuguese Jesuits
1896 births
1988 deaths
Portuguese psychiatrists
Portuguese missionaries